Tmesisternus helleri is a species of beetle in the family Cerambycidae. It was described by Kriesche in 1926.

References

helleri
Beetles described in 1926